Mince may refer to:

 MINCE, an early text editor for CP/M microcomputers
 Mincing, a food preparation technique in which food ingredients are finely divided
 Ground meat, also known as mince, meat that has been minced
 Ground beef, also known as beef mince, ground meat made from beef
 Mince (dish), a dish consisting of ground beef ("mince") and other ingredients, typically as part of the traditional Scottish dish of mince and tatties 
 Mincemeat, a mixture of chopped dried fruit, distilled spirits, spices and, historically, meat
 Mince pie, a small pie made from mincemeat, traditionally served during the Christmas season
 Minced oath, an expression based on a profanity or a taboo term that has been altered to reduce the objectionable characteristics

People
 Mince Fratelli, a member of Scottish rock band The Fratellis
 Johnny Mince (1912–1997), an American swing jazz clarinetist

Places
 Mińce, a village in north-eastern Poland
 Mincing Lane, a street in the City of London

See also 
 Minced meat (disambiguation)